The 2016–17 FA Cup (also known as the FA Challenge Cup) was the 136th edition of the oldest recognised football tournament in the world. It was sponsored by Emirates, and known as The Emirates FA Cup for sponsorship purposes. 736 clubs were accepted into the tournament, and it began with the Extra Preliminary Round on 6 August 2016, and concluded with the final on 27 May 2017. The winner qualified for the 2017–18 UEFA Europa League group stage.

Premier League side Manchester United were the defending champions, but were eliminated in the quarter-finals by Chelsea.

Arsenal won a record 13th title following a 2–1 win over Chelsea in the final, winning their third FA Cup in 4 seasons.

The tournament was also notable for the performance of Lincoln City from Level 5, who became the first non-league club to reach the quarter-finals since 1914.

This edition of the FA Cup was the first in which quarter-final matches were played to a result on the day, instead of being subject to replay in case of a draw. However, all four matches were settled without the need for extra time.

Teams

Prize fund

Round and draw dates
The schedule was as follows.

Qualifying rounds

The qualifying competition began with the Extra Preliminary Round on 6 August 2016. All of the competing teams that are not members of either the Premier League or English Football League had to compete in the qualifying rounds to secure a place in the First Round Proper. The final (fourth) qualifying round was played over the weekend of 15 October.

First Round Proper
The First Round draw took place on 17 October and was broadcast live on BBC Two and BT Sport. All 40 First Round Proper ties were played on the weekend of 5 November. 32 teams from the qualifying competition joined the 48 teams from League One and League Two to compete in this round. The round included one team from Level 9 still in the competition, Westfields, who were the lowest-ranked team in this round.

Second Round Proper
The second round draw took place on 7 November at Haig Avenue, home of Southport F.C., immediately prior to the Southport-Fleetwood tie, and was broadcast live on BT Sport. The round included one team from Level 7 still in the competition, Stourbridge, who were the lowest-ranked team in this round.

Third Round Proper
A total of 64 clubs played in the third round; 20 winners of the second round, and 44 teams from Premier League and EFL Championship entering in this round. The draw was held on 5 December 2016 at the BT Tower and was broadcast live on BT Sport and BBC Two. The matches were played across the weekend of 6–9 January 2017. The round included five non-league teams, including one team from Level 7 still in the competition, Stourbridge, who were the lowest-ranked team in this round.

Fourth Round Proper
A total of 32 teams played in the fourth round, all winners of the third round. The draw took place at the BT Tower on 9 January 2017. The round included two teams from Level 5 who were still in the competition: Lincoln City, leading the National League on the night of their third round replay and Sutton United, fifteenth on the same night and therefore the lowest-ranked team to play in this round.

Fifth Round Proper
A total of 16 clubs played in the fifth round, all winners of the fourth round. The draw was held on 30 January 2017, and the matches were played across the weekend of 18–20 February 2017. The round included the two teams from Level 5 that were still in the competition: Lincoln City and Sutton United, whose fourth round victories ensured the first ever fifth round with two non-league sides remaining. Lincoln City were in this round for the first time in 115 years and Sutton United for the first time in their history.

Quarter-finals
A total of eight clubs played in the quarter-finals, all winners of the fifth round. The draw was held on 19 February 2017 at Ewood Park, home of Blackburn Rovers F.C., immediately following the Blackburn Rovers v Manchester United match. Matches were played between 11 and 13 March 2017.

In a break from tradition, the FA officially renamed the stage the 'Quarter-finals', the name that had long been used colloquially to describe what was previously called the Sixth Round Proper. Changes to previous rules meant that tied matches would have gone to extra-time and potentially a penalty shootout at this stage rather than to a replay, and that a fourth substitute would have been permitted in extra time. The round included Lincoln City from Level 5, who became the first non-league club to reach the quarter-finals since 1914.

Semi-finals
 
The four winners of the quarter-finals progressed to the semi-finals. The semi-final draw took place at Stamford Bridge on 13 March following the quarter-final tie between Chelsea and Manchester United. The semi-finals were played at Wembley Stadium on 22 and 23 April 2017.

Final

Bracket
The following is the bracket which the FA Cup resembled. Numbers in parentheses next to the match score represent the results of a replay, except for the quarter-finals stage onwards. Numbers in parentheses next to the replay score represents the results of a penalty shoot-out except for the quarter-finals stage onwards.

Top goalscorers

a Theo Robinson moved to Southend United during the January transfer window with Lincoln still in the cup.

Broadcasting rights
The following matches were broadcast live on UK television:

Notes

References

External links

 The official FA Cup website

 
2016–17
FA Cup
England